Qanat-e Mirza Jalil (also Romanized as Qanāt-e Mīrzā Jalīl; also known as Kahrīz) is a village in Churs Rural District, in the Central District of Chaypareh County, West Azerbaijan Province, Iran. At the 2006 census, its population was 602, in 144 families.

References 

Populated places in Chaypareh County